Dominican College Sion Hill is one of the oldest girls' secondary schools in Ireland, founded in 1836 in Blackrock, County Dublin. Its approach to education is based on the Dominican ideal of developing the whole person. "Dominican College Sion Hill aims to help each student achieve her full potential academically, spiritually, emotionally and socially in a happy environment." Orla Condren is the current principal. , it had 444 girls enrolled. It is a national school and has a catchment area of Blackrock-Monkstown-Dún Laoghaire-Dalkey.

History

Foundation
Sion Hill was founded by the Dominican Sisters in 1836, in a suburban villa called Sion Hill because of rare shrubs brought by its owners from the Holy Land. In the beginning the school catered for 40 day pupils, 8 boarders and 10 nuns. By 1950 this had increased to 120 day pupils and 130 boarders. The boarding school closed in the late 1960s and the school has since catered only for day pupils.

Grounds
There used to be two grass hockey pitches attached to the school but these were sold off in 1990 for residential development, built by 1992. In 2016 a new multi-use all-weather pitch was built to support physical education.

Concert Hall
A school concert hall was established in 1928, and modernised in 2008.

Sports

Hockey
Sion Hill has a long tradition of playing hockey. They have teams participating in the Leinster Schoolgirls competitions. The teams are professionally coached and use the facilities of an all-weather hockey pitch.

Tennis
Sion Hill has teams participating in the Leinster Championships. The tennis facilities comprise 1 tennis court and during summer the hockey pitch can be adapted to provide several more.

Basketball
Sion Hill has teams participating in the Dublin League. The teams are professionally coached and use 1 indoor court.

Other sports
There are other sports provided for at Sion Hill, such as athletics and Zumba.

Extracurricular

Music
The music department offers music at Junior and Leaving Certificate level, with opportunities to pursue the music technology option, and conducting, for the Leaving Certificate.

There are three voluntary choirs and an orchestra in the school which perform at various school functions and go carol singing annually at Powerscourt Townhouse Centre in Dublin. Sion Hill also enters competitions such as the Cork Choral Festival, the Arklow Music Festival (2nd place in 2006), the Wesley Inter-Schools Festival (1st prize, March 1999) and the Department of Education examinations (making the regional finals in 1995 and 1996).

Debating
Debating is a popular activity with many successes in various competitions debating in English, Irish, French and German.

Clubs
Sion Hill also has clubs such as St. Vincent Paul, Alive and an Art Club.

Notable alumni and teachers
 Niamh Bhreathnach, former Minister for Education and Science, Labour Party TD
 Clare Cryan, artist
 Frances Fitzgerald, Fine Gael MEP and former Tánaiste, Minister for Justice and Equality and TD
 Mary Hanafin, former Minister for Education and Science, Fianna Fáil TD
 Róisín Ingle, columnist and features editor at The Irish Times
 Sr. Mary Stanislaus MacCarthy (1849–1897), poet, educator and nun
 Sr. Dr. Margaret Mac Curtain, prioress and principal of Sion Hill
 Frances Moran, barrister and legal scholar
 Breeda Moynihan-Cronin, politician
 Sinéad O'Connor, singer

References

External links
 Official website

Blackrock, Dublin
Secondary schools in Dún Laoghaire–Rathdown
Dominican schools in the Republic of Ireland
Catholic secondary schools in the Republic of Ireland
1836 establishments in Ireland
Educational institutions established in 1836
Schools in County Dublin